Stura di Demonte is a  long river in northwestern Italy (Piedmont).

Geography 
The river is a tributary to the river Tanaro, which is a tributary of the river Po. Its source is in the Alps, near the border with France. It flows through Demonte and Cuneo before joining the Tanaro just east of Cherasco.

See also 
 Stura di Demonte Valley

Notes

Rivers of the Province of Cuneo
Rivers of Italy
Rivers of the Alps